Laria may refer to:

 Leucoma, a genus of moths
 Laria District, a district in Peru
 Laria language, an Indo-Aryan language of India